Michael Anthony Small (born 2 March 1962) is an English former professional footballer who played as a forward.

Playing career
Small began his professional career with Luton Town and made three substitute appearances for them in 1981–82. After a stint on loan at Peterborough United, Small played in Belgium with Standard Liège, the Netherlands with Vitesse Arnhem, NAC Breda and Go Ahead Eagles, and in Greece with PAOK.
Small spent the 1990–91 season at Second Division side Brighton & Hove Albion and scored 21 goals, a total which made him the club's top scorer, helping them to reach the play-off final.

He joined West Ham United of the First Division in 1991 for a fee of £400,000. He made his debut against Luton on 17 August 1991 and scored 18 goals in his first season, but could not prevent the club being relegated, and found himself returning to the Second Division.

Small received a red card in the first game of the 1992–93 season and, with competition from Trevor Morley and recent arrival Clive Allen, rarely featured after that. He played his last game for West Ham against Notts County on 13 March 1993.
Towards the end of his Hammers contract, Small spent time on loan to Wolverhampton Wanderers, where he scored against Sunderland, and also with Charlton Athletic in 1993–94.

Coaching career
Small went into non-league management at Haringey Borough of the Spartan South Midlands League Premier Division before going on to co-manage Kingsbury Town of the Isthmian League. 
He joined the management team at Waltham Forest in late 2007, only to depart at the turn of the year after a disagreement with the club's chairman.

References

External links
 
 

1962 births
Living people
Footballers from Birmingham, West Midlands
Association football forwards
English footballers
English expatriate footballers
Bromsgrove Rovers F.C. players
Luton Town F.C. players
Peterborough United F.C. players
Go Ahead Eagles players
Standard Liège players
NAC Breda players
SBV Vitesse players
PAOK FC players
Brighton & Hove Albion F.C. players
West Ham United F.C. players
Wolverhampton Wanderers F.C. players
Charlton Athletic F.C. players
BK Häcken players
Stevenage F.C. players
Sligo Rovers F.C. players
Derry City F.C. players
Expatriate footballers in the Netherlands
Expatriate footballers in Belgium
Expatriate footballers in Greece
Expatriate footballers in Sweden
Expatriate association footballers in Ireland
English expatriate sportspeople in Ireland
Expatriate association footballers in the Republic of Ireland
Southern Football League players
Belgian Pro League players
Eredivisie players
English Football League players
League of Ireland players
Super League Greece players
Allsvenskan players
English football managers
Haringey Borough F.C. managers
Kingsbury Town F.C. managers
Black British sportsmen